Christina Koning is a novelist, journalist and academic.

Life
Koning was born in Kuala Belait, Borneo, and spent her early childhood in Venezuela and Jamaica.  After coming to England, she was educated at Girton College, Cambridge and the University of Edinburgh – the setting for her first novel.

She has worked extensively as a travel writer and literary critic – notably as Books Editor for The Times and Cosmopolitan, and on BBC Radio 4's Woman's Hour - and was a judge for the Society of Authors' McKitterick Prize for three years.

As an academic, she has taught Creative Writing at the University of Oxford and University of London, and was the 2014-15 Royal Literary Fund Fellow at Newnham College, Cambridge.  She has taught at Cambridge University's Institute of Continuing Education at Madingley Hall and was Editor of Collected, the Royal Literary Fund's magazine.

Koning's first novel, A Mild Suicide (Lime Tree, 1992) is set in Edinburgh in 1977 and was short-listed for the David Higham Prize for Fiction.  Her second novel Undiscovered Country (Penguin, 1997) won the Encore Award and contended for the Orange Prize for Fiction.  That novel explores aspects of colonialism, an awareness from her early childhood in Venezuela.  Fabulous Time (Viking, 2000) is another novel with colonial themes and is partly set in China during the Xinhai Revolution (1911 revolution).  It won the Society of Authors Travelling Scholarship. The Anglo-Zulu War in South Africa (1879) is the setting for her work The Dark Tower (Arbuthnot, 2010).

Recent novels include Variable Stars (Arbuthnot, 2011), about the 18th-century astronomer Caroline Herschel and Line of Sight (Arbuthnot, 2014), the first in a series of detective stories set during the 1920s in the aftermath of the First World War.  Game of Chance (Arbuthnot, 2015), set in 1929, continues the Blind Detective series, and is followed by Time of Flight (Arbuthnot, 2016), Out of Shot (Arbuthnot, 2017), and End of Term (Arbuthnot, 2018).

Koning has two children, and lives in Cambridge.

Bibliography

Novels
A Mild Suicide (1992)
Undiscovered Country (1998)
Fabulous Time (2001)
The Dark Tower (2010)
Variable Stars (2011)
Line of Sight (2014)
Game of Chance (2015)
Time of Flight (2016)
Out of Shot (2017)
End of Term (2018)

References

External links
Official website
Arbuthnot Books
Christina Koning on Twitter
Christina Koning on Facebook
Christina Koning on She Writes

Living people
20th-century British novelists
21st-century British novelists
Alumni of Girton College, Cambridge
Academics of Birkbeck, University of London
Academics of the University of Oxford
Academics of the University of Cambridge
People from Cambridge
Year of birth missing (living people)
Academics of the Institute of Continuing Education
British women travel writers